Hess Lake is a  lake in Newaygo County, in the U.S. state of Michigan.

It has an easily accessible public boat launch. Wheeler Drain directs agricultural run off into this lake. Agricultural runoff has been a problem in this lake.

References

Lakes of Newaygo County, Michigan